Horn is a village in the Dutch province of Limburg. It is a part of the municipality of Leudal, and lies about 5 km northwest of Roermond.

History 
The village was first mentioned in 1102 as "Engelbertus de Hurne", and means "corner". Horn developed in the Early Middle Ages along the Maas. In 1102, a Heer of Horn existed. In 1450, it became the capital of the County of Horn. In 1614, Horn became part of the Prince-Bishopric of Liège. In 1839, it became part of the Kingdom of the Netherlands.

Horn Castle is a located on an artificially enlarged hill surrounded by a dry moat. In the 13th century an irregular square motte-and-bailey castle with four corner towers was built probably on the site of an earlier castle. In the 15th century, the castle was enlarged. Two corner towers were demolished and a new tower was built above the gate. In 1615, it was damaged by war. During the 18th century, the castle started to deteriorate and was used as a farm. In 1798, the castle was restored and extended. It was lightly damaged by war in 1945, however the living quarters suffered a fire in 1948.

The Catholic St Martinus Church is a three aisled church with detached tower. It was built between 1936 and 1937 as a replacement of the 1838. The tower was blown up in 1944, and rebuilt shortly after.

Horn was home to 797 people in 1840. It was a separate municipality until 1991, when it was merged with Haelen. In 2007, it became part of the municipality of Leudal.

Notable people
 Leo Beulen (1960) Commander of the Royal Netherlands Army 
 Wilhelmus Demarteau (1917–2012) Bishop emeritus of Diocese of Banjarmasin
 Maurice Graef (1969) footballer
 Teunkie van der Sluijs (1981) theatre director
 Steve Wijler (1996) archer

Gallery

References

Populated places in Limburg (Netherlands)
Former municipalities of Limburg (Netherlands)
Leudal